Katharina "Kati" Bellowitsch (born 13 June 1974) is an Austrian radio and TV presenter.

Career
Born in Graz, Styria, Bellowitsch trained as a primary school teacher before becoming, in 1996, a presenter at a commercial radio station in Styria (Antenne Steiermark). Since 2000, she has been working for the ORF, both for Hitradio Ö3 and children's television, in particular a weekly and a daily programme called Forscherexpress ("Researchers' Express"), where children are introduced into the world of science, and Drachenschatz (Dragon's treasure), which is a quiz show for children. She co-hosts in both of them with Thomas Brezina.

In February 2010, she was a presenter at the Vienna Opera Ball.

Bellowitsch announced Austria's voting results in the Eurovision Song Contest from 2011 to 2016, and again in 2018.

References

External links 
 

Austrian television presenters
Austrian women television presenters
Austrian radio presenters
Austrian women radio presenters
Mass media people from Graz
1974 births
Living people
ORF (broadcaster) people